Nungua is a  town in Krowor Municipal District in the Greater Accra Region of southeastern Ghana near the coast. Nungua is the eighteenth most populous settlement in Ghana, in terms of population, with a population of 84,119 people.

Politics 
Nungua is located within Krowor Constituency led by Agnes Naa Momo Lartey, a member of the National Democratic Congress, who succeeded Elizabeth Afoley Quaye of the New Patriotic Party.

Traditions 
The people of Nungua are Ga Dangmes.They celebrate the Kpledzoo festival. They are in eight clans, namely: Nii Mantse We, Nii Moi We, Nii Borte We, Nii Adzin We, Nii Borkwei We, Nii Osokrono We, Nii Odarteitse We, and Nii Djenge We. The paramount chief of Nungua is King (Dr) Odaifio Welentsi III.

Education 
Education can be accessed in all levels in Nungua. Notable schools include:

Tertiary schools 

 The Regional Maritime University
 Laweh Open University College
 GCB Bank Training School

Senior high schools 

 Nungua Secondary School
 Nungua Presbyterian Secondary Commercial school
 St Peter's Anglican Senior High School
 Royal Technical College

Basic schools (public) 

 Nungua Methodist '1' Basic School
 Nungua Methodist '2' Basic School
 St. Paul Anglican Basic Schools
 Nungua Lekma Basic Schools
 Nungua Presby Basic Schools.

Transport 
Nungua is  accessible by rail, road and sea. It is served by a station on the eastern network of the national railway system. A bridge that was out of service for some time was repaired in 2009.  Taxi, tro tro (mini buses), Metro Transit Buses are available on road. canoes are also used by local folks along the beach.

See also 
 Railway stations in Ghana
Elizabeth Afoley Quaye

References 

Populated places in the Greater Accra Region
Ghanaian culture